Liang Wenchong (born 2 August 1978) is a Chinese professional golfer. He was the highest ranked golfer from the People's Republic of China and the first Chinese golfer to have reached the top 100 of the Official World Golf Ranking. He succeeded his mentor Zhang Lianwei as the top Chinese player.

Professional career
Liang has played on the Asian Tour, Japan Golf Tour and OneAsia Tour. He finished 21st on the 2006 Japan Golf Tour money list, after finishing second at the Fujisankei Classic. In 2008 he was second at the Japan PGA Championship. At the Asia-Pacific Panasonic Open he finished third in 2008 and second in 2009. In 2014 he finished second at the KBC Augusta.

After more than a dozen top-10 finishes on the Asian Tour, he won the 2007 Clariden Leu Singapore Masters, which was co-sanctioned by the Asian Tour and the European Tour. He was the second golfer from the People's Republic of China to win on the European Tour after Zhang Lianwei. In 2007, Liang won the Order of Merit on the Asian Tour, becoming the first from mainland China to do so.

In 2009, he finished second at the Barclays Singapore Open, a European Tour event. On the 2013 European Tour, he finished third at the Lyoness Open and Avantha Masters.

In August 2007, he became the first golfer from the People's Republic of China to play in the PGA Championship. He ended up missing the cut. He also received a special invitation to play in the 2008 Masters Tournament. In July 2008, Liang became the first Chinese golfer to make the cut at a major, The Open Championship at the Royal Birkdale Golf Club. In August 2010, Liang set a new course record at Whistling Straits with his 8-under 64 in the third round of the 2010 PGA Championship, where he finished eighth.

In 2013, Liang won the Resorts World Manila Masters in the Philippines then donated half of his winner's purse of US$135,000 to victims of Typhoon Haiyan (also known as Typhoon Yolanda) that had recently ravaged the country.

Amateur wins (3)
1996 China Amateur Open Championship
1997 China Amateur Open Championship
1998 China Amateur Open Championship

Professional wins (21)

European Tour wins (1)

1Co-sanctioned by the Asian Tour

European Tour playoff record (1–0)

Japan Golf Tour wins (2)

Japan Golf Tour playoff record (0–1)

Asian Tour wins (3)

1Co-sanctioned by the European Tour

Asian Tour playoff record (2–0)

OneAsia Tour wins (4)

OneAsia Tour playoff record (2–0)

Other wins (12)
1999 Kunming Classic (China), Dalian Classic (China), Beijing Classic (China), Shenzhen Classic (China)
2000 Shanghai Classic (China), Beijing Classic (China)
2001 Shanghai Classic (China), Davidoff Nations Cup (with Zhang Lianwei)
2002 Dalian Classic (China)
2005 Kunming leg (China Tour)
2006 Hainan leg (Omega China Tour), Omega Championship (China)

Results in major championships

CUT = missed the half-way cut
"T" = tied

Results in World Golf Championships
Results not in chronological order before 2015.

"T" = tied
Note that the HSBC Champions did not become a WGC event until 2009.

Team appearances
Alfred Dunhill Cup (representing China): 2000
World Cup (representing China): 2001, 2007, 2008, 2009, 2011, 2013
Dynasty Cup (representing Asia): 2003 (winners), 2005 (winners)
Royal Trophy (representing Asia): 2009 (winners), 2010, 2011, 2013

References

External links

Profile on the Omega China Tour's official site (archived)

Chinese male golfers
Asian Tour golfers
Japan Golf Tour golfers
European Tour golfers
Golfers at the 1998 Asian Games
Asian Games competitors for China
Sportspeople from Guangdong
People from Zhongshan
1978 births
Living people
21st-century Chinese people
20th-century Chinese people